Wang Guosheng (born February 1947) is a retired general of the People's Liberation Army (PLA) of China. He served as commander of the Lanzhou Military Region.

Biography 
Born in Da'an, Jilin Province, Wang joined the PLA in February 1968. He then served as chief of staff of the 40th Group Army. In December 2001, he was elevated to commander of the 40th Army. He became the chief of staff of the Lanzhou Military Region in December 2003, and was promoted to commander of the Lanzhou MR in June 2007.

Wang attained the rank of major general in 1998, lieutenant general in 2005, and full general in 2010. He was a member of the 17th Central Committee of the Chinese Communist Party. He retired from active military service in 2012.

References 

Living people
1947 births
People's Liberation Army generals from Jilin
People from Baicheng
Commanders of the Lanzhou Military Region